Kreis is the German word for circle.

Kreis may also refer to:

Places 
 , or circles, various subdivisions roughly equivalent to counties, districts or municipalities
 Districts of Germany (including  and )
 Former districts of Prussia, also known as 
 Kreise of the former Electorate of Saxony
, or Imperial Circles, ceremonial associations of several regional monarchies and/or imperial cities in the Holy Roman Empire

People 
 Harold Kreis (born 1959), Canadian-German ice hockey coach
 Jason Kreis (born 1972), American soccer player
 Melanie Kreis (born 1971), German businesswoman
 Wilhelm Kreis (1873–1955), German architect

Music and culture 
Der Kreis, a Swiss gay magazine
 Kreise (album), a 2017 album by Johannes Oerding

See also
 Krai, an administrative division in Russia
 Kraj, an administrative division in Czechia and Slovakia
 Okręg, an administrative division in Poland
 Okres, an administrative division in Czechia and Slovakia
 Okrug, an administrative division of some Slavic states